Mao's Last Revolution is a 2006 book by Roderick MacFarquhar and Michael Schoenhals released by Belknap Press.

Harvard University Press presented it as "[MacFarquhar and Schoenhals] explain why Mao launched the Cultural Revolution, and show his Machiavellian role in masterminding it (which Chinese publications conceal)."

Reception 
It is considered the seminal work on the Cultural Revolution in China 1966−1976.

Judith Shapiro wrote in The New York Times 2006 that it "provides a detailed account of the salvos, currents, countercurrents, conspiracies, waves, cleansings and purges for which the era is known." She called it an "important first effort to establish the facts", "the first major history of the elite politics of the period" and that it may "encourage healthy debate over state manipulation of historical memory".

References 

Books about the Cultural Revolution
2006 non-fiction books